Mark Douglas Brown McKinney (born June 26, 1959) is a Canadian actor and comedian. He is best known as a member of the sketch comedy troupe The Kids in the Hall, which includes starring in the 1989 to 1995 TV series The Kids in the Hall and 1996 feature film Brain Candy. He was a cast member on Saturday Night Live from 1995 to 1997; and from 2003 to 2006, he co-created, wrote and starred in the series Slings & Arrows and he also appeared as Tom in FXX's Man Seeking Woman. In recent years he has appeared as store manager Glenn Sturgis on NBC's Superstore.

Early life
McKinney was born in Ottawa, Ontario, the son of Chloe, an architectural writer, and Russell McKinney, a diplomat. Because of his father's career, he did a lot of travelling when he was young. Some of the places he lived while growing up were Trinidad, Paris, Mexico, and Washington, D.C. He also attended Trinity College School, a boarding school in Port Hope, Ontario. For a short while, McKinney was a student at Memorial University of Newfoundland, where he was a political science major.

Career

He started performing comedy with the Loose Moose Theatre Company in Calgary, Alberta. There, McKinney met Bruce McCulloch. Together they formed a comedy team called "The Audience." Eventually, McKinney and McCulloch moved to Toronto, and met Dave Foley and Kevin McDonald, who were in the process of forming a comedy troupe. Along with Scott Thompson, who joined after coming to a stage show, The Kids in the Hall was formed in 1985.

The troupe appeared in their own TV series, The Kids in the Hall, which was co-produced by Lorne Michaels and ran from 1988 to 1995. Notable characters on the show played by McKinney include the Chicken Lady, Darill (pronounced da-RILL), bluesman Mississippi Gary, and Mr. Tyzik the Headcrusher, an embittered Eastern European who pretended to crush the heads of passers-by between his thumb and forefinger.

After The Kids in the Hall, McKinney joined the cast of another Lorne Michaels sketch comedy show, Saturday Night Live, in the middle of the 1994–1995 season (season 20) as a repertory player. McKinney survived the cast overhaul that occurred at the end of season 20 and stayed on SNL until the end of the 1996–1997 (season 22). During his time on SNL, McKinney had six recurring characters (some of note include Ian Daglers from "Scottish Soccer Hooligan Weekly", Melanie, a Catholic schoolgirl, and Lucien Callow, a fop often paired with David Koechner's fop character Fagan) and twenty-seven celebrity impersonations (some of note include Mel Gibson, Barney Frank, Al Gore, Paul Shaffer, Mark Russell, Jim Carrey, Lance Ito, Tim Robbins, Steve Forbes, Wolf Blitzer, Bill Gates, and Ellen DeGeneres).

He has appeared in several films, including the SNL spinoffs Superstar, The Ladies Man and A Night at the Roxbury. McKinney also starred opposite Isabella Rossellini in Guy Maddin's tragicomedy The Saddest Music in the World. He also appeared in the Spice Girls' movie Spice World. In 1999 he appeared in the Canadian television film adaptation Jacob Two Two Meets the Hooded Fang.

McKinney cowrote and starred in the Kids in the Hall movie Kids in the Hall: Brain Candy, in which, among other roles, he spoofed SNL and KITH executive producer Lorne Michaels.

Theatre
His theatre appearances include The Ugly Man with One Yellow Rabbit at the Edinburgh Fringe festival and Glasgow. He was in the cast of The Roundabout theatre production of Flea in her Ear and David Lindsay Abaire's Fuddy Meers for the Manhattan theatre club. During the fall of 2001 McKinney performed the one-man show Fully Committed at the Wintergarden theatre in Toronto and again in the summer of 2002 at the Centaur Theatre in Montreal. In September 2022 he will appear in the European premiere of Eureka Day at The Old Vic theatre in London.

Later appearances
He also appeared in the first season of Robson Arms, as well as on the Canadian comedy Corner Gas.

From 2003 to 2006, he co-created, co-wrote and starred in the TV series Slings & Arrows, about the backstage goings-on in a Canadian Shakespearean theatre company struggling with financial problems as they rehearse and present various productions.

In 2006–7 he both worked as a story editor on and a recurring role in NBC's Studio 60 on the Sunset Strip as Andy Mackinaw, a humourless widowed writer/story editor for the show-within-a-show. He appeared as a cast member on the CBC comedy Hatching, Matching, and Dispatching and its 2017 follow up A Christmas Fury.

He directed the short film Not Pretty, Really for the 2006 anthology Shorts in Motion: The Art of Seduction.

As well, he directed and appeared on the CBC Radio post-apocalyptic comedy Steve, The First and its sequel, Steve, The Second, for his friend Matt Watts. He also wrote one episode of Watts' sitcom Michael, Tuesdays and Thursdays, which aired on CBC Television in fall 2011.

In the summer of 2007, he became the show-runner and executive producer of Less Than Kind, a half hour comedy starring Maury Chaykin.

McKinney was in an episode of the Canadian children's TV show Dino Dan called "Prehistoric Zoo/Ready? Set? Dino!" He plays Dino Dan's track coach in the second part, "Ready? Set? Dino!", of this two-part episode released 4 October 2010 (Canada).

He co-wrote and starred in the Kids in the Hall 2010 reunion project Death Comes to Town.

In 2011, he was an executive producer of Picnicface, a sketch TV series from the Halifax comedy troupe of the same name produced for The Comedy Network.

In 2013, he co-starred in Rocket Monkeys as the main antagonist, Lord Peel. In 2014, he appeared in the CBC television series The Best Laid Plans. Beginning in 2015, he was a co-star on the NBC sitcom Superstore which was cancelled in 2021.

In 2020, he appeared as a guest on the Studio 60 on the Sunset Strip marathon fundraiser episode of The George Lucas Talk Show.

Filmography

Film

Television

References

External links

  

1959 births
Living people
20th-century Canadian comedians
21st-century Canadian comedians
20th-century Canadian male actors
21st-century Canadian male actors
Male actors from Ottawa
Canadian male film actors
Canadian male television actors
Canadian male voice actors
Canadian television personalities
Canadian television producers
Best Supporting Actor Genie and Canadian Screen Award winners
The Kids in the Hall members
Best Actor in a Drama Series Canadian Screen Award winners
Canadian sketch comedians
Memorial University of Newfoundland alumni
Canadian male comedians
Comedians from Ontario
Canadian Comedy Award winners